Lenticular is an adjective often relating to lenses. It may refer to:

A term used with two meanings in botany: see 
Lenticular cloud, a lens-shaped cloud
Lenticular galaxy, a lens-shaped galaxy
Lenticular (geology), adjective describing a formation with a lens-shaped cross-section
Lenticular nucleus, a lens-shaped nucleus in the brain
Lenticular lens, a technology for making moving or 3D images
Lenticular printing, a technology in which lenticular lenses are used in printing specifically
Lenticular truss bridges, a bridge with a lens-shape truss